Junk King is a privately held junk removal and recycling company with over 100 franchise territories in the United States and Canada.

History
Junk King was started in San Carlos, California in 2005 by childhood friends Mike Andreacchi and Brian Reardon. After Andreacchi had worked for 1-800-GOT-JUNK?, he observed first-hand how the branded junk removal business model increased the speed of growth of the franchises. He realized he could create his own junk removal business and service many different customers. 

Junk King began franchising in 2010 and since then has expanded across the United States. The company has also expanded into Canada under the name "Junk Works". Junk King and Junk Works reuse, recycle, or donate high percentages of items collected. As of April 2017, Junk King and Junk Works combined have over 100 franchises doing business in the United States and Canada, including in Atlanta, Boston, Cleveland, Dallas, Kansas City, Los Angeles, Pittsburgh, Sacramento, San Antonio, and San Diego.

Junk King was named one of INC. magazine's ten most promising franchises of 2011.

Junk King recycles up to 50% of all the debris they haul.

References

External links
Official Website
HotRockJunk Site

Waste management companies of the United States